The Fertilisers and Chemicals Travancore Limited, abbreviated as FACT, is an Indian central public sector undertaking headquartered in Kochi, Kerala. It was incorporated in 1943, by Maharajah Sree Chithira Thirunal Balarama Varma of the Kingdom of Travancore. It is the first fertiliser manufacturing company in independent India and also the largest Central Public Sector Undertaking (CPSU) in Kerala. The company is under the ownership of Government of India and administrative control of the Ministry of Chemicals and Fertilizers.

It has 2 production units - Udyogamandal Complex (UC) at Eloor, Udyogamandal, and Cochin Division (CD) at Ambalamedu. In 1947, FACT started production of ammonium sulphate with an installed capacity of 50,000 MT per annum at Udyogamandal near Kochi. The Caprolactam plant in Udyogamandal was commissioned in 1990. Main products include Ammonia, Sulphuric Acid, Ammonium Phosphate-Sulphate (FACTAMFOS), Ammonium Sulphate, Zincated Ammonium Phosphate, Caprolactam, and also complex fertilizers. Gypsum, Nitric acid, Soda Ash and coloured Ammonium Sulphate are major by-products.

History
The factory commenced production of ammonium sulphate in 1947, at the dawn of Indian independence using wood as the raw material for production of ammonia. With the effect of time, wood gasification became uneconomic and was replaced with naphtha reforming process. Through a series of expansion programmes, FACT soon became the producer of a wide range of fertilizers for all crops and all soil types in India. It became a Kerala State public sector enterprise in 1960 and in 1962, it came under the Government of India. Diversification to full-fledged engineering services (FEW) in the fertilizer field and allied areas followed. The next major step towards diversification was into petrochemicals.

FACT has formed a joint venture company with Rashtriya Chemicals & Fertilizers Limited, named FRBL (FACT RCF Building Products Ltd) for manufacturing load-bearing panels and other building products using phosphogypsum.

References

External links
 Official website

Companies based in Kochi
Fertilizer companies of India
Chemical companies of India
Indian companies established in 1943
Chemical companies established in 1943
Companies listed on the National Stock Exchange of India
Companies listed on the Bombay Stock Exchange